Voiebyen is a district in the city of Kristiansand in Agder county, Norway. The district has a population of about 6,000 people in 2014 and it is a part of the borough of Vågsbygd in the southwestern part of the city. The district of Vågsbygd lies to the north, and the district of Flekkerøy lies to the south on the island of Flekkerøya.

Voie Church is located in the district. Voiebyen has one junior high school, Møvik Skole and two elementary schools: Torkelsmyra skole and Voie skole.

Politics
The 10 largest political parties in Voiebyen in 2015:

Transportation
Local city buses are available from 5:00 am until 1:00 am. Bus line M2 follows the Voie ringvei road and ends in the district of  Hånes 3-5 times during the day. Lines 05 and 02 go only a few times in the morning and afternoon. Line 50 follows County road 456 out of Voiebyen to the neighboring municipality of Søgne.

Roads
County Road 456 goes through Voiebyen before exiting Kristiansand municipality on its way to Søgne. It is the old main road out of Kristiansand westbound. The Voie ringvei road follows a path around Voiebyen.

Neighbourhoods
Andøya
Bråvann
Flekkerøyhavn
Møvik
Skutevika
Steindalen
Ternevig
Voie
Voiebyen nordvest
Voiebyen nordøst
Voiebyen sørvest
Voiebyen sørøst

Media gallery

References

Populated places in Agder
Geography of Kristiansand
Boroughs of Kristiansand